San José del Golfo is a municipality in the Guatemala department of Guatemala. The Municipality of San José del Golfo is located 28 kilometers from the Capital City to the north-east of Guatemala. Its territory is broken, it belongs to the mountainous region of the Central Highlands of the Republic. The Municipality of San José del Golfo, was established under the Government of general Justo Rufino Barrios, by Decree No. 683 of March 17, 1882, and was annexed to the El Progreso Department on April 13, 1908, however years later by Decree No. 756 on June 9, 1920 it joined the Guatemala Department.

Mining 

San José del Golfo has abundant natural resources, with traditional quartz mining. However, the gold mining proyect of "El Tambor" has been opposed firmly by a community group called "La Puya"  (English: "The sting") since 2012, as it accuses the mining of environmental pollution.  Here is the sequence of events that have occurred at the location:

Natural disasters 

San José del Golfo was practically destroyed by the powerful 4 February 1976 earthquake; it has been rebuilt since, although the original colonial architecture was completely lost in the disaster.

Notes and references

References

Municipalities of the Guatemala Department